Avsey is a Russian male first name. There are several theories as to its origins. According to one, it is simply a colloquial variant of the name Yevsey. Another possibility is that "Avsey", as well as Asey and Osey, are colloquial variants of the name Absey, alternatively spelled Apsey, which until the end of the 19th century was included into the official Synodal Menologium.

The diminutive of "Avsey" is Avseyka.

The patronymics derived from "Avsey" are "" (Avseyevich; masculine) and its colloquial form "" (Avseich), and "" (Avseyevna; feminine). The patronymics derived from "Absey" are "" (Abseyevich; masculine) and "" (Abseyevna; feminine).

References

Notes

Sources
Н. А. Петровский (N. A. Petrovsky). "Словарь русских личных имён" (Dictionary of Russian First Names). ООО Издательство "АСТ". Москва, 2005. 
А. В. Суперанская (A. V. Superanskaya). "Словарь русских имён" (Dictionary of Russian Names). Издательство Эксмо. Москва, 2005. 

Russian masculine given names